The demographics of Kazakhstan enumerate the demographic features of the population of Kazakhstan, including population growth, population density, ethnicity, education level, health, economic status, religious affiliations, and other aspects of the population. Some use the word Kazakh to refer to the Kazakh ethnic group and language (autochthonous to Kazakhstan as well as parts of Russia, China and Mongolia) and Kazakhstani to refer to Kazakhstan and its citizens regardless of ethnicity, but it is common to use Kazakh in both senses.

Demographic trends 
Official estimates put the population of Kazakhstan at 18,137,300 as of December 2017, of which 44% is rural and 56% urban population. The 2009 population estimate is 6.8% higher than the population reported in the last census from January 1999 (slightly less than 15 million). These estimates have been confirmed by the 2009 population census, and this means that the decline in population that began after 1989 has been arrested and reversed.

In a report released by the United Nations Department of Economic and Social Affairs (DESA) in September 2021, the level of urbanization in Kazakhstan is estimated to reach 69.1% by 2050.

The proportion of men makes up 48.3%, the proportion of women 51.7%. The proportion of Kazakhs makes up 63.6%, Russians 23.7%, Uzbeks 2.9%, Ukrainians 2.1%, Uygur 1.4%, Tatars 1.3%, Germans 1.1%, others 3.9%. Note that a large percentage of the population are of mixed ethnicity.

The first census in Kazakhstan was conducted under Russian Imperial rule in 1897, which estimated population at round 4 million people. Following censuses showed a growth until 1939, where numbers showed a decrease to 6,081 thousand relative to the previous census done 13 years earlier, due to famines of 1922 and 1933.

But since 1939 population has steadily increased to 16.5 million in 1989, according to corresponding year census. Official estimates indicate that the population continued to increase after 1989, peaking out at 17 million in 1993 and then declining to 15 million in the 1999 census. The downward trend continued through 2002, when the estimated population bottomed out at 14.9 million, and then resumed its growth.  Significant numbers of Russians returned to Russia.  Kazakhstan underwent significant urbanization during the first 50 years of the Soviet era, as the share of the rural population declined from more than 90% in the 1920s to less than 50% since the 1970s. The fertility rate declined to amongst the lower rates in the world in 1999 and increased to again amongst the higher rates in the world in 2021.

Population of Kazakhstan 1897–2018 

Data sources: Population 1897 from Russian Empire Census. Population 1926 from First All-Union Census of the Soviet Union. Population 1939–1999 from demoscope.ru, 2002–2008 from Kazakhstan Statistical Agency web site. Rural/urban shares 1939–1993 from statistical yearbooks, print editions, 2002–2008 from Kazakhstan Statistical Agency web site. 2009–2014 from Kazakhstan Statistical Agency web site.

As of 2003, there were discrepancies between Western sources regarding the population of Kazakhstan. United States government sources, including the CIA World Fact Book and the US Census Bureau International Data Base, listed the population as 15,340,533, while the World Bank gave a 2002 estimate of 14,858,948. This discrepancy was presumably due to difficulties in measurement caused by the large migratory population in Kazakhstan, emigration, and low population density – only about 5.5 persons per km2 in an area the size of Western Europe.

Vital statistics

Births and deaths 

1

Current vital statistics

Structure of the population 
Structure of the population (01.01.2021) (Estimates):

The age group under 15 is considered below the working age, while the age group over 63(60) is above the working age (63 years for men, 60 for women).

Population Estimates by Sex and Age Group (01.VII.2020):

Total fertility rate 

Total fertility rate by regions of Kazakhstan: Mangystau – 3.80, South Kazakhstan – 3.71, Kyzylorda – 3.42, Atyrau – 3.29, Jambyl – 3.20, Aqtobe – 2.70, Almaty (province) – 2.65, Almaty (city) – 2.65, City of Astana – 2.44, West Kazakhstan – 2.29, Aqmola – 2.19, East Kazakhstan – 2.07, Qaragandy – 2.04, Pavlodar – 1.98, North Kazakhstan – 1.72, Qostanay – 1.70, Republic of Kazakhstan – 2.65. Thus it can be seen that fertility rate is higher in more traditionalist and religious south and west, and lower in the north and east, where the percentage of Slavic and German population is still relatively high.

According to the Kazakhstan Demographic and Health Survey in 1999, the TFR for Kazakhs was 2.5 and that for Russians was 1.38. TFR in 1989 for Kazakhs & Russians were 3.58 and 2.24 respectively.

Life expectancy at birth 

Source: UN World Population Prospects

Ethnic groups

History of ethnic composition 
Kazakhstan's dominant ethnic group, the Kazakhs, traces its origins to the 15th century, when after the disintegration of Golden Horde, numbers of Turkic and Turco-Mongol tribes united to establish the Kazakh Khanate. With a cohesive culture and national identity, they constituted an absolute majority on the land until colonization by the Russian empire.
Russian advances into the territory of Kazakhstan began in the late 18th century, when the Kazakhs nominally accepted Russian rule in exchange for protection against repeated attacks by the western Mongolian Kalmyks. In the 1890s, Russian peasants began to settle on the fertile lands of northern Kazakhstan, causing many Kazakhs to move eastwards into Chinese territory in search of new grazing grounds. The 1906 completion of the Trans-Aral Railway between Orenburg and Tashkent further facilitated Russian colonization.

The first collective farms were formed in Kazakhstan in 1921, populated primarily by Russians and Soviet deportees. In 1930, as part of the first Five Year Plan, the Kazakh Central Committee decreed the sedentarization of nomads and their incorporation into collectivized farms. This movement resulted in devastating famines, claiming the lives of an estimated 40% of ethnic Kazakhs (1.5 million), between 1930 and 1933. Hundreds of thousands also fled to China, Iran and Afghanistan. The famine made  Kazakhs a minority of the population of Kazakhstan, and only after the republic gained independence in 1991 did Kazakhs have a slim demographic majority within Kazakhstan.

Demographics did shift in the 1950s and 1960s, when, as part of Nikita Khrushchev's Virgin Lands Campaign, hundreds of thousands of Soviet citizens relocated to the Kazakh steppes in order to farm. As recognized in the 1959 census, the Kazaks became the second-largest ethnic group in Kazakhstan for the first time in recorded history, comprising just 30% of the total population of Kazakhstan. Russians numbered 42.7%.

Since the Soviet Union's collapse, the numbers of members of European ethnic groups has been falling and Asian groups have been continuously rising. According to the 2021 census, the ethnic composition of Kazakhstan was approximately: 70.4% Kazakh, 15.5% Russian, 3.2% Uzbek, 2.0% Ukrainian, 1.5% Uyghur, 1.1% Tatar, 1.2% German, and <1% Korean, Turkish, Azerbaijani, Belarusian, Dungan, Kurdish, Tajik, Polish, Kyrgyz, Chechen.

Religion

See also 
Ethnic conflicts in Kazakhstan

References

Bibliography 
 
.

External links 
For current data, use these sites.
Population and social policy, Statistical Agency of the Republic of Kazakhstan (kaz
World Bank Database
CIA World Fact Book page on Kazakhstan
US Census Bureau International Data Base
countrystudies.us
WESP population statistics 
Russians left behind in Central Asia